Gustavo Garcia-Siller, M.Sp.S. (born December 21, 1956) is a Mexican-American prelate of the Catholic Church. He has been serving as archbishop of the Archdiocese of San Antonio in Texas since 2010.  He previously served as an auxiliary bishop of the Archdiocese of Chicago in Illinois from 2003 to 2010

Biography

Early life 
The oldest of fifteen children, Gustavo Garcia-Siller was born on December 21, 1956, in San Luis Potosí, Mexico. He entered the Missionaries of the Holy Spirit in Mexico City in 1973, and was sent to the United States in 1980 to minister to migrant workers in California. He also studied at St. John's Seminary in Camarillo, California, obtaining Master of Divinity and Master of theology degrees.

Priesthood 
Garcia-Siller was ordained to the priesthood for the Missionaries Order on June 22, 1984. He then served as an associate pastor at St. Joseph Parish in Selma, California until 1988. He furthered his studies at the Western Institute of Technology and Higher Education (ITESO) in Guadalajara, Mexico, earning a Master of Psychology degree,  and at the Pontifical Gregorian University in Rome.

From 1990 to 1999, Garcia-Siller served as rector of the Holy Spirit Missionaries' houses of studies in Lynwood and Long Beach, California, and in Portland, Oregon. On December 15, 1998, Garcia-Siller became a citizen of the United States.

Garcia-Siller was rector of his order's theologate in Oxnard, California, from 1999 to 2002, also serving in three parishes of the Archdiocese of Los Angeles. He was then named superior of the Holy Spirit Missionaries' vicariate for the United States and Canada in 2002.

Auxiliary Bishop of Chicago

On January 24, 2003, Garcia-Siller was appointed auxiliary bishop of the Archdiocese of Chicago and Titular Bishop of Oescus by Pope John Paul II. He received his episcopal consecration on March 19, 2003, from Cardinal Francis George, with Bishops Raymond E. Goedert and Ricardo Urquidi serving as co-consecrators. As an auxiliary bishop, Garcia-Siller served as episcopal vicar for Vicariate V and the Cardinal's liaison to the Hispanic community.

Archbishop of San Antonio
On October 14, 2010, Pope Benedict XVI named Garcia-Siller to succeed José Gómez as Archbishop of San Antonio. His installation took place on November 23, 2010. Along with Gómez, he is one of the highest-ranking Mexican-American bishops in the United States.

See also

 Catholic Church hierarchy
 Catholic Church in the United States
 Historical list of the Catholic bishops of the United States
 List of Catholic bishops of the United States
 Lists of patriarchs, archbishops, and bishops

References

External links

 Roman Catholic Archdiocese of San Antonio Official Site

1956 births
Living people
Mexican emigrants to the United States
People from San Luis Potosí City
St. John's Seminary (California) alumni
Mexican Roman Catholic missionaries
Roman Catholic Archdiocese of Chicago
21st-century Roman Catholic archbishops in the United States
Roman Catholic archbishops of San Antonio
Religious leaders from Illinois
Roman Catholic missionaries in the United States